Taman Tuanku Jaafar is a major township in Negeri Sembilan, Malaysia. It was named after the tenth Yang di-Pertuan Besar of Negeri Sembilan, Tuanku Jaafar. The township can be accessed via Senawang Tol PLUS Highway and LEKAS Highway.

Taman Tuanku Jaafar saw the construction of several schools such as Sekolah Kebangsaan Taman Tuanku Jaafar, Sekolah Kebangsaan Taman Tuanku Jaafar 2 & Sekolah Menengah Kebangsaan Taman Tuanku Jaafar, SK Senawang, SJKT Ladang Seremban and SJKT Ladang Senawang. Due to the rapid development and increase in population within the township, the nearby town of Sungai Gadut also saw much development including the construction of the Sungai Gadut Komuter station. Meanwhile, the commercial area of Taipan Senawang houses numerous banks, restaurants, provision stores and other amenities. Additionally, there are also hypermarkets nearby: Giant Senawang, Mydin Mall Senawang and Tesco Senawang. Taman Tuanku Jaafar also sees the operation of night market which operates once a week in the nearby bus station. Places of worship includes Kuil Sri Maha Raja Rajeswar & Masjid Kariah Taman Tuanku Jaafar.

References 

Populated places in Negeri Sembilan